Elections to the Tripura Tribal Areas Autonomous District Council (TTAADC) were held on 4 May 2015. 25 of the 28 elected seats in the Autonomous District Council are reserved for Scheduled Tribes.

There were 638,060 eligible votes cast in the elections. The electoral turnout stood at 83%. The votes were counted on 6 May 2015. The election result was a landslide victory for the Left Front. The Left Front, with 48.88% of the votes cast, won all 28 seats that were up for election. 25 seats went to the Communist Party of India (Marxist), one seat to the Communist Party of India, one seat to the RSP and one seat to the All India Forward Bloc.

The Indigenous People's Front of Tripura (IPFT) emerged as a second-largest party in the election. The party finished second in 17 seats. Other parties in the fray were the Indigenous Nationalist Party of Tripura, National Conference of Tripura, All India Trinamool Congress and BJP.

Results

See also
 2010 Tripura Tribal Areas Autonomous District Council election
 2005 Tripura Tribal Areas Autonomous District Council election
 2000 Tripura Tribal Areas Autonomous District Council election

References

2015 elections in India
Elections in Tripura
History of Tripura (1947–present)
Autonomous district council elections in India
Local elections in Tripura